Tetragonidiaceae is a family of cryptomonads which includes two genera. Members of Tetragonidiaceae are distinguished from other cryptomonads by reproduction occurring in a non-motile vegetative phase, as well as the formation of multicellular filaments unlike any other cryptomonad family.

References 

Cryptomonads